The Comment Section is a weekly American infotainment television series which premiered on the E! network, on August 7, 2015. Announced in May 2015, the show is hosted by Michael Kosta and "explores the biggest stories of the week and all of the outrageous and hilarious comments made about them on social media."

References

External links 

 
 
 

2010s American satirical television series
2015 American television series debuts
2015 American television series endings
E! original programming
English-language television shows
Infotainment
Television series about television
2010s American video clip television series